The Royal Trains were special train carriages used by New Zealand Railways during royal visits to New Zealand, which occurred in 1901, 1920, 1927, 1935 and 1954. Each Royal Train was preceded by a pilot train, a similar arrangement to that used in Britain.

The Duke and Duchess of Cornwall, 1901 
The train was built and used for the visit of Prince George Frederick Ernest Albert (George V) (1865–1936) and his Duchess, who travelled on 25 June 1901 by rail from Christchurch to Dunedin. They then returned to Lyttelton via the same route before embarking for Tasmania on 27 June 1901 on HMS Ophir, a purposely converted ocean liner of the Orient Line.

The Prince of Wales, 1920 

George V's eldest son Edward Albert Christian George Andrew Patrick David (Edward VIII), Prince of Wales used the same train to travel from Auckland to Rotorua on 27 April 1920. The journey was disturbed by a rail strike, causing him to return to Auckland. Afterwards, Edward embarked on the Renown for the town of Picton on the South Island.

Duke and Duchess of York, 1927 

George VI and his wife, Lady Elizabeth Bowes-Lyon, travelled by train and car to Rotorua on 24 February 1927, where a World War I memorial was unveiled. They then visited many cities on the North Island. In Nelson, the Duchess fell ill with tonsillitis and could not continue on the journey. The Duke travelled alone by train and car to Christchurch on the west coast, where he received the Freedom of the City. On 22 March 1927, he and his wife continued their journey to Australia.

Royal passenger cars 
In 1927 two passenger cars were built in the Petone Workshops for that year's royal tour by the Duke of York (later King George VI); they were then hired to tourists or used as Ministerial cars. In 1934 two passenger cars were built for the tour of the Duke of Gloucester. They were later used by the Governor-General and refurbished for the 1953 royal tour by Queen Elizabeth II. With separate rail networks, one car was required for each island.

References

Further reading 

 

Monarchy in New Zealand
Rail transport in New Zealand